The year 1895 in archaeology involved some significant events.

Explorations
 Teoberto Maler makes first examinations of the Maya site of Seibal.
 Eliseo Borghi begins first examinations of the Nemi ships wreck site.

Excavations

Finds
Mithraeum at Sarrebourg.
Roman coin hoard at Boscoreale.

Publications

Births

Deaths
 5 March: Sir Henry Rawlinson, 1st Baronet, English Assyriologist (b. 1810).

References

Archaeology, 1895 In
Archaeology by year
1890s in science
Archaeology, 1895 In